Canada and New Zealand have played 16 games against each other, with New Zealand winning every match. Their first matchup was at the inaugural 1991 Rugby World Cup in Wales, the Black Ferns defeated Canada 24–8 in their pool game. They met again at two other World Cup's — 2006 and 2017.

The Black Ferns and Canada have competed in several competitions other than the World Cup. In 1999, they competed at the Triangular '99 along with the United States. The Canada Cup which they both participated in between 1996 and 2005, and once for the Churchill Cup in 2004. It was later replaced with the Super Series which New Zealand won in 2015 and 2019. The Pacific Four Series later replaced the Super Series with the Black Ferns winning the 2022 edition.

Summary

Results

References

External links 

 Results Summary at stats.allblacks.com

Canada women's national rugby union team
New Zealand women's national rugby union team